No One Gets Out of Her Alive is a 1998 EP by PIG.

Track listing
 "No One Gets Out of Her Alive" (Raymond Watts, Steve White) – 5:53
 "Jump the Gun" (R. Watts, White) – 5:14
 "Contempt" (R. Watts, White) – 4:31
 "Satanic Panic" (R. Watts, White) – 7:04
 "The Murder Car" (R. Watts, Michael Watts) – 4:49
 "No One Gets Out of Her Alive (KMFDM Remix)" – 5:21
 "Contempt (Sniper Remix)" – 5:33
 "Find It, Fuck It, Forget It (Sump Mix)" – 4:43

Personnel
Raymond Watts
Steve White
Sakurai Atsushi – additional vocals (1)
Imai Hisashi – additional guitars (1)
Carol Ann Reynolds – additional vocals (1-3, 6)

References

Pig (musical project) albums
1998 EPs